Antonio Eromonsele Nordby Nusa (born 17 April 2005) is a Norwegian professional footballer who plays for Belgian side Club Brugge.

Career
Starting his career in Langhus IL, he moved to Stabæk's youth section at the age of 13. He was given the chance for the senior team in early 2021, scored in a friendly match, and subsequently signed for the senior squad. He made his Eliteserien debut in May 2021 against Rosenborg, and scored his first goal in June 2021 against Bodø/Glimt.

During the last transfer day of summer 2021, he signed a contract with Club Brugge. On 13 September 2022, he scored a goal in his Champions League debut in a 4–0 away win against FC Porto. Moreover, he became the youngest player to score on his debut in the competition.

Personal life
Born in Norway, Nusa is of Nigerian descent through his father.

References

External links

2005 births
Living people
People from Ski, Norway
Norwegian people of Nigerian descent
Sportspeople from Viken (county)
Norwegian footballers
Association football forwards
Norway youth international footballers
Eliteserien players
Belgian Pro League players
Stabæk Fotball players
Club Brugge KV players
Norwegian expatriate footballers
Norwegian expatriate sportspeople in Belgium
Expatriate footballers in Belgium